Tinkoff or Tinkov may refer to:

Oleg Tinkov (born 1967), Russian businessman
Tinkoff (cycling team), a Russian-registered professional cycling team
Tinkoff Bank, a Russian commercial bank
Tinkoff Brewery, a Russian brewery
Tinkoff Credit Systems, a professional continental cycling team based in Italy